Brephomorpha is a monotypic moth genus in the family Cossidae described by David Stephen Fletcher in 1982. It contains only one species, Brephomorpha cineraria, described by Alfred Jefferis Turner in 1945, which is found in Australia, where it has been recorded from northern Queensland.

References

External links

Zeuzerinae
Monotypic moth genera